Peggy Corrine Cramer (June 27, 1937 – August 4, 2016) was a catcher who played for the South Bend Blue Sox of the All-American Girls Professional Baseball League in 1954. Listed at 5' 4", 125 lb., she batted and threw right handed.

Cramer was just 16-years old when she joined the league in its last season. After the league folded, she went on to become a teacher for the next 28 years.

In 1988, Cramer became part of Women in Baseball; a permanent display based at the Baseball Hall of Fame and Museum in Cooperstown, New York, which was unveiled to honor the entire All-American Girls Professional Baseball League.

References

Sources
The Women of the All-American Girls Professional Baseball League: A Biographical Dictionary – W. C. Madden. Publisher: McFarland & Company, 2005. Format: Softcover, 295 pp. Language: English. 

1937 births
2016 deaths
All-American Girls Professional Baseball League players
South Bend Blue Sox players
Baseball players from Michigan
People from Buchanan, Michigan
21st-century American women